Stadionul Central is a multi-purpose stadium in Avrig, Romania. It is currently used mostly for football matches, is the home ground of FC Avrig. The stadium was opened in 2013 and has a capacity of 1,000 seats.

References

External links
Stadionul Central (Avrig) at soccerway.com

Football venues in Romania
Sport in Sibiu County
Buildings and structures in Sibiu County